Seljord is a municipality in Telemark in the county of Vestfold og Telemark in Norway. It is part of the traditional regions of Upper Telemark and Vest-Telemark.  The administrative centre of the municipality is the village of Seljord.  The parish of Siljord was established as a municipality on 1 January 1838 (see formannskapsdistrikt). 
 
Seljord is famous for its sea serpent, Selma, who allegedly lives in Lake Seljord (Seljordsvatnet).

The yearly Dyrsku'n market, held since 1866, attracts 60–80,000 visitors each year. The large fair started as a show of farm animals. Today it includes a huge market with vendors selling a variety of goods including base layer clothing, Bergans outdoors equipment, crafts, and food. Amusement rides are also featured.

Seljord Folkehøgskule is located in Seljord. The school offers a variety of courses including outdoor adventure, theater, music, and art. 
Seljord Folk High School

General information

Name
The municipality (originally the parish) is named after the old Seljord farm (Old Norse: Seljugerði), since the first church was built there. The first element is the genitive case of selja which means "sallow-tree" or "willow" and the last element is gerði which means "field".  Prior to 1889, the name was written "Silgjord" or "Sillejord".

Coat-of-arms
The coat-of-arms is from modern times.  They were granted on 15 September 1989.  The arms show the sea serpent Selma in a gold-color on a red background.

Notable residents 

 Anne Godlid (1773-1863) 19th century Norwegian storyteller
 Jacob Andreas Wille (1777–1850) priest, teacher and Mayor of Seljord
 Daniel Bremer Juell (1808-1855) Bishop of Tromsø 1849-1855
 Jørund Telnes (1845-1892) farmer, teacher, writer and Mayor of Seljord
 Halvor J. Sandsdalen (1911-1998) a writer and folklore collector
 Ingebjørg Kasin Sandsdalen (1915-2003) a Norwegian poet
 Aslaug Høydal (1916-2007) a Norwegian schoolteacher, novelist, poet and children's writer
 Terje Grøstad (1925–2011) a Norwegian painter and illustrator, lived in Flatdal
 Hallvard Flatland (born 1957) TV personality
 Kim Leine (born 1961) a Danish-Norwegian author
 Helga Flatland (born 1984) novelist and children's writer, brought up in Flatdal

Gallery

References

External links

Municipal fact sheet from Statistics Norway

 
Municipalities of Vestfold og Telemark
Villages in Vestfold og Telemark